Sufi Motahar Hossein (11 September 1907 – 20 August 1975) was a prominent Bangladeshi poet. He wrote poetry in the sonnet genre.  Hossein was born in a highly respectable and educated Muslim family.  His Father Mohammad Hashim was a Sub-Inspector of Bengal Police. His Mother Tayebatunnisa Khatun was a landlord. He was awarded Bangla Academy Literary Award in 1974, Presidency Award in
1970 and Adamjee Literary Award in 1965 in the poetry category.

Education and career
Hossein studied in Faridpur Zilla School and Jagannath College. He graduated from the University of Dhaka in 1931.

Hossein worked in the District Judge's court at Faridpur.

Awards
 Bangla Academy Literary Award (1975)
 Presidency Award (1970)
 Adamjee Literary Award (1965)

References

1907 births
1975 deaths
People from Faridpur District
Bangladeshi male poets
Sonneteers
Recipients of Bangla Academy Award
Date of birth missing
Place of death missing
Recipients of the Adamjee Literary Award